M Health Fairview University of Minnesota Masonic Children's Hospital (formerly known as Amplatz Children's Hospital) is a non-profit pediatric acute care hospital located in Minneapolis, Minnesota. The hospital has 212 beds and is affiliated with University of Minnesota Medical School. The hospital provides comprehensive pediatric specialties and subspecialties to pediatric patients aged 0–21 throughout Minnesota and midwest United States. Masonic Children's Hospital is also a state designated Level III Trauma Center.

History 
The history of a University of Minnesota pediatric program went as far back as the 1930s when the first pediatric cardiology unit was opened. In 1951, this unit later expanded into a 40-bed pediatric unit at Variety Club Heart Hospital along with a playroom and classrooms. In 1986, pediatric services were brought together in a new building. The new hospital included 3 pediatric units, a neonatal intensive care unit, a pediatric intensive care unit (PICU),and a pediatric bone marrow transplant unit. The new facility was named University-Variety Hospital for Children. On the other side of town, Fairview Health (before merge) first opened its own dedicated pediatric unit in 1955.

The modern day children's hospital first opened up in 2011 at a cost of $25 million and was named Amplatz Children's Hospital. In 2014, the hospital was renamed to University of Minnesota Masonic Children's Hospital. In 1997, M Health merged with Fairview and the hospital is now known as M Health Fairview University of Minnesota Masonic Children's Hospital after a large donation. The hospital is 6 stories large and includes multiple different inpatient units.

Services 
Masonic Children's Hospital also features a level 4 neonatal intensive care unit.

It provides pediatric programs including pediatric general surgery, imaging, and neonatal and pediatric intensive care to cardiac and oncology services, blood and marrow transplant, bone marrow, and organ transplantation. The hospital also includes Minnesota's only children's behavioral inpatient unit and programming that focuses on children ages 12 and younger.

See also 
 M Health Fairview University of Minnesota Medical Center
 Shriners Children's

References

Hospitals in Minnesota
Hospitals established in 1986
Buildings and structures in Minneapolis
Children's hospitals in the United States